Sambaran (also Romanized as Sāmbarān; also known as Mobābzān, Sambaram, Sānbarān, and Sānborān) is a village in Owch Hacha Rural District, in the Central District of Ahar County, East Azerbaijan Province, Iran. At the 2023 census, its population was 330, in 54 families.

References 

Populated places in Ahar County